Miami Exposé is a 1956 American film noir crime film directed by Fred F. Sears and starring Lee J. Cobb, Patricia Medina and Edward Arnold. The film marked the last performance of Arnold, who was fatally stricken during the production. Also in the film is a brief appearance by boxing great Jake "The Raging Bull" LaMotta, playing a thug during the Everglades chase scene.

Plot
Miami police lieutenant Bart Scott informs his captain of his plans to retire. His fiancée, Ann Easton, a widow whose husband was killed in the line of duty, refuses to marry Bart until he quits the force.

The captain is murdered by a gunman who also is found dead. The gunman's wife, Lila Hodges, witnesses the crime. She becomes of grave concern to many in Miami with criminal ties, including attorney Raymond Sheridan, who is offering lobbyist Oliver Tubbs a million-dollar bribe to get Miami gambling legalized, and gangster Louis Ascot, who offers Lila sanctuary and takes her to Cuba.

Scott manages to get to Lila and persuade her to return to Miami to testify. When she expresses reluctance to do so, he parades her in public, where thugs attempt to kill her. Convinced that she has to help, Lila is taken to Scott's home in the Everglades to remain in hiding until the trial, but when Ascot comes after her, Lila and Ann end up armed and trying to hold off the gunmen until Scott can arrive with reinforcements. Sheridan, meanwhile, after double-crossing Tubbs, is killed by him.

Cast
 Lee J. Cobb as Lt. Barton 'Bart' Scott
 Patricia Medina as Lila Hodges
 Edward Arnold as Oliver Tubbs
 Michael Granger as Louis Ascot
 Eleanore Tanin as Ann Easton
 Alan Napier as Raymond Sheridan
 Harry Lauter as Det. Tim Grogan
 Chris Alcaide as Morrie Pell
 Hugh Sanders as Chief Charles Landon
 Barry L. Connors as Stevie Easton

References

External links
 
 
 
 
 Review of film at Variety

1956 films
1956 crime films
American crime films
American black-and-white films
Films set in Miami
Columbia Pictures films
Films directed by Fred F. Sears
1950s English-language films
1950s American films